Ludmilla Pitoëff (December 25, 1896 – September 15, 1951) was a Russian-born French stage actress. She also appeared in London and New York, as well as in some films.

Biography 
Born in Tiflis, Russia on December 25, 1896, she married Georges Pitoëff and began appearing with his company in 1917 at venues in Paris including the Théatre des Arts, the Comédie des Champs-Elysées, the Vieux Colombier, and Théâtre des Mathurins. She made her London stage debut in 1930 playing Jeanne in Saint Jeanne (reportedly George Bernard Shaw’s favorite actress to play the role), then as Marguerite Gautier in La Dame aux Camélias. She went to the United States after her husband’s death in 1939 and in 1944 made her Broadway debut as Madame Fisher in The House in Paris. She also appeared in films including La danseus rouge, Mollenard and Les eaux troubles.

Pitoeff died on September 15, 1951.

Further reading
 Aniouta Pitoëff, Ludmilla, ma mère : vie de Ludmilla et de Georges Pitoëff, Julliard, 1955, 296 pp.

References

1896 births
1951 deaths
French actresses
Emigrants from the Russian Empire to France